James Gilbert may refer to:
James Gilbert (footballer), Scottish footballer
James Gilbert (producer) (1923–2016), British television producer and director
James Daniel Gilbert (1864–1941), British Liberal politician, banker and City merchant
James Isham Gilbert (1823–1884), Union general in the American Civil War
James Freeman Gilbert (1931–2014), American geophysicist
James H. Gilbert (born 1947), Justice of the Minnesota Supreme Court